The Prix Iris for Best Cinematography in a Documentary is an annual film award, presented by Québec Cinéma as part of its Prix Iris awards program, to honour the year's best cinematography in documentary films made within the Cinema of Quebec.

The award was presented for the first time at the 19th Quebec Cinema Awards in 2017.

2010s

2020s

See also
Canadian Screen Award for Best Cinematography in a Documentary

References

Awards established in 2017
Cinematography in a Documentary
Awards for best cinematography
Canadian documentary film awards
Quebec-related lists